Murat Alaçayır (born 1 August 1973) is a retired Turkish football midfielder and later manager.

References

1973 births
Living people
Turkish footballers
Bandırmaspor footballers
Kartalspor footballers
Altay S.K. footballers
Beşiktaş J.K. footballers
Diyarbakırspor footballers
Sakaryaspor footballers
İzmirspor footballers
Association football midfielders
Süper Lig players
Turkish football managers